The Balkan Race Walking Championships is an annual racewalking competition between athletes from member nations of Balkan Athletics. The championships features six individual races: senior men's and women's 20 kilometres race walks, men's and women's under-20 10 kilometres race walks, an under-18 boys' 10 km walk, and an under-18 girls' 5 kilometres race walk. Each individual race also has a national team component with points awarded based on finishing time, which are then totalled to form an overall team score for the championships.

Balkan racewalking competitions originated in the main Balkan Athletics Championships. A men's 20 km walk was first held in 1961 and a women's 10 km walk was introduced in 1988 (later increased to a 20 km race in 2001). One-off indoor walks were also held at the Balkan Indoor Athletics Championships in 1994. The Balkan championships for racewalking were first held separately from the main championships in 2000, though Balkan Athletics starting their official numbering of a discrete Balkan Race Walking Championships from 2002 onwards.

List of winners (20 km)

References

Winners list
Results. Balkan Athletics. Retrieved 2020-03-29.
Balkan Championships. GBR Athletics. Retrieved 2020-02-06.

External links
Official website of Balkan Athletics

Racewalking competitions
Under-20 athletics competitions
Under-18 athletics competitions
Racewalking
Recurring sporting events established in 2002
Annual sporting events